Sanford is an American sitcom television series and a sequel to the original 1972–1977 sitcom Sanford and Son. It was broadcast on NBC from March 15, 1980 to July 10, 1981.

Background
In 1977, after six seasons of Sanford and Son, Redd Foxx left the NBC show to star in a variety show for ABC. His new show, The Redd Foxx Comedy Hour, was cancelled after just four months.

Plot

First season
Sanford premiered in March 1980 as a midseason replacement. Demond Wilson refused to reprise his role as Fred's son, Lamont. His absence was explained by having Lamont away working on the Alaska pipeline. Fred's new business partner in the Los Angeles-based junkyard was Cal Pettie (Dennis Burkley), an overweight white Southerner, originally from Texas, with a generally optimistic attitude and jovial demeanor. Cal had worked with Lamont on the pipeline and Lamont sent him to visit his father. Cal moves into Lamont's old room. Rollo Lawson (Nathaniel Taylor), a recurring character on the previous series, was now working for Fred as a delivery man. (The events of the previous series Sanford Arms - cancelled after four episodes - where Fred and Lamont had moved to Arizona after selling the property to Fred's Army buddy Phil Wheeler, were completely ignored.)

Fred meets a customer who is an upper-class widow named Evelyn (Marguerite Ray). The two begin dating much to the dismay of Evelyn's snobbish brother Winston (Percy Rodriguez), and sharp-tongued maid Clara (Cathy Cooper), who see Fred as low-class. Her daughter Cissy (Suzanne Stone) was more accepting of Fred. Later in the season, Aunt Esther's college student son Cliff (Clinton Derricks-Carroll) moves in with Fred and Cal starts dating Cissy. (In the original series, Cliff's name was Daniel.) Officers Smitty and Hoppy (Hal Williams and Howard Platt), recurring characters from the original series, appeared in five episodes. Sammy Davis Jr. appeared as himself in two episodes, first in an uncredited cameo appearance (for which he also directed the episode), and then in the season finale in which Fred persuades Davis to perform for Evelyn's charity.

The show was highly promoted by NBC, and the premiere episode garnered solid ratings; however, the ratings dropped as the season progressed, and the show ended up ranking well outside the top 30 of the Nielsen ratings for the 1979–1980 season, whereas Sanford and Son consistently ranked in the top 10 except in its final season (by that time, the original series had dropped to number 27). Sanford was then put on hiatus to be retooled.

Second season
The show returned in January 1981 again as a mid-season replacement. The show was moved from Saturdays to the Friday night death slot. The original series of the 1970s dominated on Friday night for several seasons. Aunt Esther (LaWanda Page) appeared in the two-part season premiere (along with another episode later in the season). It was explained that her husband Woodrow had died and she was moving in to prevent Fred from being a bad influence on Cliff. While Derricks-Carroll was now featured in the opening credits, he only appeared in a few episodes of the season. This season now focused more on the relationship between Fred and Cal. Evelyn was now reduced to a recurring character and instead of being Fred's fiancee, she is simply dating him. The characters of Rollo, Winston, Cissy, and Clara were dropped with no explanation. Grady (Whitman Mayo), another recurring character from the original series, appeared in two episodes as a special guest star. Officers Smitty and Hoppy also reappeared several times.

The season attempted to rebuild the duo concept Sanford and Lamont had in the original series by focusing on storylines with their bonding. Some storylines includes Cal's racist mom coming to visit, not knowing Sanford was black, Sanford providing fatherly advice to both Cal and Cliff. This was noted in "Cal the Coward" and "Love Is Blind". A recycled storyline was used from the original series by having Cal in lieu of Lamont fall in love with an illegal alien who is later deported. A few episodes were in a more traditional sitcom format that allowed more serious moments, as the original was strictly comedy.

The retooled Sanford fared poorly in the ratings and NBC pulled the series at the end of January prior to the February sweeps, having only aired five episodes. NBC burned off the remaining seven episodes over the summer.

Given the abrupt cancellation, the final aired episode was not written nor intended to serve as a series finale. The episodes were most likely taped in mid- to late 1980 with the intention of the series doing better in the ratings.

Cast
Redd Foxx as Fred Sanford
Dennis Burkley as Cal Pettie
Nathaniel Taylor as Rollo Lawson (season 1)
Marguerite Ray as Evelyn Lewis (season 1; recurring, season 2)
Cathy Cooper as Clara (season 1)
Suzanne Stone as Cissy Lewis (season 1)
Percy Rodrigues as Winston (season 1)
LaWanda Page as Esther Anderson (season 2)
Clinton Derricks-Carroll as Clifford Anderson (season 2; recurring, season 1)

Episodes

Season 1 (1980)

Season 2 (1981)

Syndication
Sanford has not been included in the syndication package with Sanford and Son. However, reruns aired on BET throughout the 1990s. The show returned to BET in March 2008. To celebrate the return, an all day marathon of all 26 episodes occurred on March 8, 2008 to celebrate Daylight Saving Time as 'San-forward'. In 2022, the complete series became available to stream for free on Tubi.

References
Brooks, Tim; Earl Marsh (2003). The Complete Directory to Prime Time Network and Cable TV Shows. Ballantine Books. .
The Ironic Death of Redd Fox Part Two

External links

1980 American television series debuts
1981 American television series endings
1980s American sitcoms
1980s American black sitcoms
English-language television shows
NBC original programming
Sanford & Son spin-offs
American television spin-offs
Television series by Sony Pictures Television
Television shows set in Los Angeles
American sequel television series